Sheila Jozi (born 1984), better known by her mononym Sheila or at times Sheila J, is a German folk music and schlager music singer of Persian (Iranian) descent.

She started singing at a young age, appearing in Persian-German community occasions. At 11 years old, she won a children's music competition singing a cover of Céline Dion song. She was signed with Koch Universal and released her debut album Emotionen.

Discography

Albums
2004: Emotionen [Koch Universal]

External links
Sheila on MySpace

German folk singers
Living people
1984 births
21st-century German women singers